Hope Island may refer to:

Places

Antarctica
 Nadezhdy Island (Hope Island)

Australia
 Hope Island, Queensland, a suburb of Gold Coast City
 Hope Island (Tasmania)
 Hope Islands (Queensland), islands that form part of Rossville, Shire of Cook
 Hope Islands National Park, a national park on these islands

Canada
 Cape Hope Islands, Nunavut
 Hope Island (Ontario)

Greenland
 Kangeq, Greenland, a settlement formerly known as the Island of Hope

India
 Hope Island, India

Kiribati
Arorae (formerly called Hope Island)

Norway
 Hope Island, Norway, also called Hopen

United States
 Hope Island (Maine)
 Hope Island (Rhode Island)
 Hope Island State Park (Mason County, Washington)
 Isle of Hope, Georgia

Fiction
 Hope Island (TV series)
 Home of Gaia in the series Captain Planet and the Planeteers